Corinth is an unincorporated community in Carroll County, Virginia, United States.

References

Unincorporated communities in Carroll County, Virginia
Unincorporated communities in Virginia